Boyette may refer to the following:

Places
Boyette, Florida, unincorporated community, United States

People
Garland Boyette (1940-2022), American football player
Keith Boyette, American pastor in the Global Methodist Church
Pat Boyette (1923-2000), American broadcasting personality, news producer, and comic book artist
Griffin Boyette Bell (1918-2009), American lawyer and former Attorney General